Erling Bjørnson (19 April 1868 – 7 December 1959) was a Norwegian farmer and politician for the Agrarian Party and later Nasjonal Samling.

He was born in Copenhagen, the son of Karoline and Bjørnstjerne Bjørnson. He was elected to the Parliament of Norway in 1933 from the constituency Oppland, and was re-elected in 1936.

References

1868 births
1959 deaths
People from Gausdal
Norwegian farmers
Oppland politicians
Members of the Storting
Members of Nasjonal Samling

People convicted of treason for Nazi Germany against Norway